Patricia "Patri" Guijarro Gutiérrez (born 17 May 1998) is a Spanish professional footballer who plays as a midfielder for FC Barcelona and Spain women's national football team. She is the fourth-choice captain for Barcelona.

Guijarro has played a major role in Spain's most recent generation of youth national team success, making important contributions to their under-17, under-19 and under-20 teams. Most notably, she received the Golden Ball and Golden Boot at the 2018 FIFA U-20 Women's World Cup as Spain finished second, their best ever finish at a U-20 World Cup. Additionally, after her transfer to FC Barcelona Femení from UD Collerense in 2015, she has found both domestic success and European success with the club. Guijarro was part of the Barcelona squad that reached their first Champion's League final in 2019, as well as being integral part of the Barcelona side that won the 2020-21 UEFA Women's Champions League. Her performances for Spain's youth and senior teams and Barcelona have made her widely considered one of the best midfielders in the world.

Early life
Patricia Guijarro was born on May 17, 1998, in Palma, the capital city of the island of Mallorca. She recounts being born into a "football family" and shared an interest in the sport with her parents since a young age. She started playing football at age seven under her father's influence. The first club she played for was hometown club CF Patronato.

Club career

Collerense
At fourteen years old, Guijarro was called to play with the youth levels of the UD Collerense squad after she could no longer play with boys.

She was promoted to Collerense's first team at just fifteen years old. In a match against Barcelona, she caught the attention of then Barcelona coach Xavi Llorens who moved to sign her the following summer.

Barcelona
 

Guijarro's transfer to FC Barcelona was finalized in June 2015 with a three-year deal.

At the start of the 2017–18 season, she scored in a 3-0 Copa Catalunya victory against Espanyol, earning her third Copa Catalunya trophy. In the semifinal of the 2017–18 Women's Champions League, she scored her first ever UWCL goal away at Lyon that helped keep Barcelona in the tie. In the home leg, however, Barcelona were victim of a Eugénie Le Sommer strike that Guijarro nearly knocked off the goal-line, and exited in the quarterfinals to the eventual tournament winners. She played in each of Barcelona's matches in the 2018 Copa de la Reina, including the semifinal that went to penalties. She successfully converted her penalty as Barcelona advanced to their seventh Copa de la Reina final. She started the final against Atlético Madrid that went to extra time and was rescued by a Mariona Caldentey goal in the 122nd minute that won her her second Copa de la Reina title.

For a large portion of the 2018–2019 season, Guijarro was sidelined with a ganglion cyst injury on her right foot that lasted almost 5 months and required two operations. She was discharged from injury hours before the 2019 Champion's League Final, but did not feature in Barcelona's 4–1 loss to Lyon later that day.

At the start of the 2019–2020 season, she was given team captaincy for the first time as the fifth-choice captain. In February 2020, she played in the first edition of the Supercopa de España Femenina, and was the first Barcelona player to score in the semifinals against Atlético Madrid with an outside the box volley. She started the final against Real Sociedad, a 1–10 win that earned Barcelona and Guijarro their first ever Supercopa de España Femenina trophy.

In the first game of Barcelona's 2020–21 league season, she scored the first goal in a match against Real Madrid Femenino, making her the first goalscorer in the women's version of El Clásico. Later that same season, Guijarro played the 2021 UEFA Women's Champions League Final, where she was put out-of-position at right centerback due to typical starting right centerback Andrea Pereira being suspended for the final. On 16 May 2021, a day before her 23rd birthday, Guijarro started and played all 90 minutes of the match which ended 4-0 in Barcelona's favor.

Upon the departure of first-captain Vicky Losada, Guijarro's role advanced to fourth-captain for the 2021–22 season.

International career

Youth
Guijarro has had extensive individual and team success at the youth level.

Spain U17
Guijarro's first international youth tournament experience came when she was fifteen, with a callup to play for Spain at the 2013 UEFA Women's Under-17 Championship. She played all 90 minutes of Spain's two matches in the finals. The first finals match against Sweden went to penalties, and despite her penalty conversion, Spain lost the shootout 4–5. They got some compensation, however, by defeating Belgium 4–0 in the next match. Guijarro scored Spain's third goal of the match as they bowed out as third-place finishers.

Months later, in November, Guijarro was part of the Spain team at 2014 UEFA Women's Under-17 Championship. She kicked off her tournament with a win against then-World champions France by scoring a goal from a corner to make the score 2–0. A 4-0 thrashing of Germany put them at the top of their group and found them playing England in the semifinals, a match they won 2–0. She drew first blood in the final against Germany, scoring in the ninth minute with a shot from outside the area. Germany found a goal later in the match, and it stayed tied through extra time, ending up in penalties. She scored Spain's first and only penalty as Germany exacted revenge for their group stage loss by defeating them 3–1 in the shootout.

In April of the following year, she participated in the 2014 U-17 Women's World Cup. Guijarro's two tournament goals came in a quarterfinal brace against Nigeria, one of which was a penalty and the other a close-range shot from a loose ball. She earned player of the match as Spain moved onto the semi-finals. Spain went on to win the semifinal tie against Italy to reach their first U17 World Cup Final, but were defeated by 2-0 Japan as Spain recorded a runner-up finish in consecutive U17 tournaments.

The 2015 UEFA Women's Under-17 Championship was her final tournament as a U17 player. After two group stage wins and a draw, Spain finished above Germany, and they met France yet again in the knockout round. For the third time in a row at U17 UEFA tournaments, Spain faced a penalty shootout. Unlike the other times, however, they were successful, with Spain's only miss out of the five attempts coming from Guijarro, who hit the post. She started the final where Spain found themselves winning 5–2 against Switzerland, her first ever international title. She was selected again for the Team of the Tournament.

Spain U19
At the 2016 UEFA Women's Under-19 Championship, she played every minute of the group stage wins against Germany and Austria as Spain swept Group B and moved on to win 4–3 against Netherlands in the semifinal. Against France in the final, Spain had plenty of attempts on goal, and in a last-gasp effort to secure a comeback, she missed a shot from a corner service which was parried out after two more Spain shots. Spain came runner-up as Guijarro played every minute of every match she featured in and was named to the team of the tournament.

Spain's first match of the 2017 UEFA Women's Under-19 Championship was a win against Northern Ireland. Guijarro's first tournament goal came in the 53rd minute as a volley from distance. Following a loss against Germany, Spain was to play Scotland who had 3 points and 1 point, respectively, meaning whoever won the match moved onto the next round and automatically qualified for the 2018 U-20 Women's World Cup. She scored the game winner and her second tournament goal in that match, allowing Spain to finish second in the table with 6 points as they moved onto the knockouts.

In the semifinals against the Netherlands, she sent in an assist for Maite Oroz that put Spain up 2–1. Guijarro scored the game winning third goal in the 77th minute, securing Spain's trip to their fourth consecutive U19 EURO final even after they would concede again in the 85th. In the final of the tournament, she responded to France's opening goal with a volley in the box serviced from a corner. As the match advanced, the scoreline went to 2-2 until the 89th minute when she scored her third match-winner of the tournament with a headed goal off of a Carmen Menayo free-kick. With that goal, Spain ended their streak of three consecutive finals defeats at the U19 EUROs and won their first U19 EURO title since 2004. She was given the Golden Ball as the tournament's best player, the Golden Boot as the tournament's highest scorer, and named to the Team of the Tournament.

Spain U20

Spain had a relatively unsuccessful run at the 2016 FIFA U-20 Women's World Cup. Guijarro's first and only tournament goal came in a 5–0 win against Canada, in which she also assisted a Lucía García stoppage time strike. She then started in a win against Japan and was rested for a loss against Nigeria. At the end of the group stage, Spain sat at second in the table, advancing them to the knockouts. They bowed out in a 3–2 loss against North Korea in the quarterfinals.

Guijarro was named vice captain for the 2018 FIFA U-20 Women's World Cup. She started the tournament by scoring a hat-trick against Paraguay in the first match of the group stage. She went on to score again in the group stage against the United States in a match that ended a 2–2 draw, effectively knocking out the United States in the group stages for the first time ever in a U20 tournament.

In the quarterfinals, Spain faced Group D runner-ups Nigeria, and Guijarro scored yet another match-winner just before halftime. With her match winner, Spain reached the semifinals of a U-20 Women's World Cup for the first time ever. Spain met the previous tournament's runner-up, France, in the next round. She headed in her sixth goal of the tournament in the semifinal matchup, which had her leading in the Golden Boot race. Her goal was the only goal of the tie and Spain advanced to their first U-20 Women's World Cup final with a 1–0 win. Spain lost their captain Aitana Bonmatí through suspension against France, so Guijarro started with the captain's band for the final against Japan. Despite many attempts on goal, she was kept scoreless in the final against Japan as Spain fell 1–3.

Before the final, England forward Georgia Stanway tied her six-goal tally in the third-place match against France. They both ended their tournaments with six goals and she shared top scorer honors with Stanway, but Guijarro earned the Golden Boot by registering an additional three assists. She was also awarded the Golden Ball and was named to the Team of the Tournament. The tournament was her final youth international experience as she transitioned to a full senior international between 2018 and 2019. As of 2019, she remains Spain's highest scorer with the U-20 women's team with seven goals.

Senior

Her first senior national team cap and start came in a goalless draw against Iceland at the 2017 Algarve Cup. This was the final match of the group stages, and their point and goal difference put them in the first place match against Canada. She subbed on for Mapi León late in the match to help maintain a 1–0 lead. This victory earned Guijarro and Spain their first ever senior international title.

She played every match for Spain in the 2019 Women's World Cup qualifiers where she scored two goals. Her first senior international goal was a 91st minute match-winner that came in a qualifying match against Serbia, keeping them on top of the qualification group. Her second international goal came against Austria four days later in a 4–0 win. Spain won all of their qualifying matches and were the first European team to qualify for the tournament other than the hosts France.

By 2018, Guijarro had established herself as a regular starter with the Spain national team. At the 2018 Cyprus Women's Cup, she played in two of Spain's group stage matches- two wins against Austria and the Czech Republic. Seven points and a +3 goal difference at the end of the group stage meant Spain were to face Italy in the final of the tournament. In the 80th minute of the final, she connected with service from a corner to send in Spain's second goal. Spain's 2–0 win was Spain's first Cyprus Women's Cup title and Guijarro's second title with Spain's senior team.

She was called to Spain's 2019 Women's World Cup squad days after being discharged from a long-term injury on her right foot. She sat out the first match against South Africa as a precaution for her recently healed injury. She made her World Cup debut in the next match, a group stage clash against European powerhouse Germany, subbing on in the 65th minute for Silvia Meseguer. She then started and played all 90 minutes of Spain's next two matches- a draw in the final group stage match against China and Spain's first ever knockout match of a Women's World Cup against the United States. Spain and Guijarro fell in the Round of 16 to the eventual tournament winners despite putting up a well-fought performance.

Career Statistics

Club

International goals

Style of play
Guijarro describes her playing style with Spain differently from her playing style with Barcelona. With Barcelona "(she) has a more defensive role" whereas with Spain she plays as an "interior with a more advanced role." She considers herself an offensive player.

In various player profiles and interviews, FIFA has described her type of play as "a creative midfielder who covers a lot of ground and gets into the opposition box." They've also described her as a box-to-box midfielder who "can start moves, play the final ball, and create chances by herself."

Spain and Barcelona teammate Aitana Bonmatí has describes her as "bringing a lot of balance to the team," "able to play a more advanced role by making runs into the box" and having a great shot. Other teammates like Eva Navarro call her "a perfect all-around player."

Personal life
Her idol is Spain teammate and fellow Balearic Islands native Virginia Torrecilla. She has also cited Andrés Iniesta as an idol.

She was the first girl at La Masia to take her A Levels and is currently studying physiotherapy.

Honours

Club
FC Barcelona
Primera División: 2019–20, 2020–21, 2021–22
UEFA Women's Champions League: 2020–21;
Copa de la Reina: 2017, 2018, 2020, 2021
Supercopa de España Femenina: 2019–20, 2021–22
Copa Catalunya: 2015, 2016, 2017, 2018, 2019

International
Spain (youth)
UEFA Women's Under-17 Championship: Winner, 2015
UEFA Women's Under-19 Championship: Winner, 2017; Runner-up, 2016
FIFA U-20 Women's World Cup: Runner-up, 2018

Spain
 Algarve Cup: Winner, 2017
 Cyprus Cup: Winner, 2018

Individual
UEFA Women's Under-17 Championship Team of the Tournament: 2015
UEFA Women's Under-19 Championship Team of the Tournament: 2016, 2017
UEFA Women's Under-19 Championship Golden Ball: 2017
UEFA Women's Under-19 Championship Golden Boot: 2017
FIFA U-20 Women's World Cup Golden Ball: 2018
FIFA U-20 Women's World Cup Golden Boot: 2018
 UEFA Women's Champions League Squad of the Season: 2020–21

Awards and recognition
In 2018, Guijarro made The Guardian's yearly list of the 100 best women's footballers, coming in at number 68. They described her as one of the best midfielders in the world.

Notes

References

External links
 
 
 Patricia Guijarro at FC Barcelona
 Patricia Guijarro at BDFutbol
 
 
 

1998 births
Living people
Spanish women's footballers
Primera División (women) players
FC Barcelona Femení players
Footballers from Palma de Mallorca
Women's association football midfielders
2019 FIFA Women's World Cup players
Spain women's international footballers
UD Collerense (women) players
UEFA Women's Euro 2022 players
Spain women's youth international footballers